The Australian Society of Anaesthetists is an association that  seeks to further the best interests of
anaesthesia and anaesthetists.

History
The Australian Society of Anaesthetists (ASA) was founded in 1934 by Geoffrey Kaye. It was established as a means to exchange ideas, for the distribution of memoranda on topics of anaesthetic interests, and to conduct inquiries relating to problems in the practice of anaesthesia in Australia. Mary Taylor Burnell (then Angel) was the   first female member and the secretary of the South Australian Section of the Society in 1935.

The ASA is now one of the largest and leading medical associations in Australia, delivering a range of services of the highest quality to members. Membership consists of specialist anaesthetist as well as registrar trainees and non-specialist medical practitioner anaesthetists.

Membership
Presently the Society has over 3000 members representing a majority of Australian specialist anaesthetists. It is one of the largest medical associations in Australia. Membership consists of specialist anaesthetist as well as registrar trainees and non-specialist general medical practitioner anaesthetists.

Governance
The ASA is a governed by a seven member board of directors consisting of the current and most recent former president, treasurer, executive councillor, an independent director, and two members elected by the ASA Council. The Council consists of the same group plus a vice president and a number of state and territory representatives and chairs of ASA committees.

Meetings 
The Society holds a National Scientific Conference annually in the southern hemisphere spring. Recent meetings have taken place in Melbourne, Darwin and Wellington.
A wide variety of other meetings take place in the various states, such as educational meetings combined with the Australian and New Zealand College of Anaesthetists, Part 0 and Part 3 meetings for junior and senior trainees respectively and rural meetings that bring together specialist and general practitioner providers of anaesthesia.

Publications 

Anaesthesia and Intensive Care, published by SAGE Publishing, is the official journal of the Australian Society of Anaesthetists, the Australian and New Zealand Intensive Care Society and the New Zealand Society of Anaesthetists.

Australian Anaesthetist is the Society’s membership magazine. Produced four times a year the magazine has a different theme each issue focusing on what is happening within the Society and across the Australian anaesthetic community.

The Relative Value Guide (RVG) provides comprehensive and accurate advice on billing and assists with deciphering the Medicare and private insurance rebate systems. The RVG is available exclusively to members in hardcopy, online PDF and as an App.

Related organisations 
 New Zealand Society of Anaesthetists 
 Australian and New Zealand College of Anaesthetists

See also 
 History of general anesthesia

References

External links 
 Official website
 Official website of Anaesthesia and Intensive Care, scientific journal of the Society
 All About Anesthesia—Patient information about anaesthesia and anaesthetics
 Anaesthesia Continuing Education

Medical associations based in Australia
Anesthesiology organizations
1934 establishments in Australia